Escena (foaled 1993 in Kentucky, died 2015) is an American Thoroughbred racehorse. She had her best season as a five-year-old in 1998 when her wins included the Breeders' Cup Distaff. In that season she was voted American Champion Older Female Horse at the Eclipse Awards.

Background
Bred and raced by Allen Paulson, she was out of the mare Claxton's Slew, a daughter of 1977 U.S. Triple Crown champion Seattle Slew. Her sire was the great international runner Strawberry Road, who was the 1983 Australian Champion Racehorse of the Year and the 1984 German Champion Older Male Horse. Strawberry Road also sired Allen Paulson's Champion filly and 1997 Breeders' Cup Distaff winner Ajina. Escena was trained by U.S. Racing Hall of Fame inductee William I. Mott.

Racing career
Escena raced from age two through age five. She won two of her three starts in her debut season at age two, then at age three earned her first Graded stakes race at Oaklawn Park in Hot Springs, Arkansas, in the 1996 Fantasy Stakes. After finishing second in three Grade I races in 1996, the following year she got her first Grade I win in the Ramona Handicap at Del Mar Racetrack in Del Mar, California. She went on to finish third in the 1997 Breeders' Cup Distaff behind winner and stablemate Ajina.

At age five, Escena blossomed into a racing star under jockey Jerry Bailey. She won the Grades 1 Vanity Invitational and Apple Blossom Handicaps plus at Churchill Downs, and the Grades II Louisville Breeders' Cup and Fleur de Lis Handicaps. She capped off her 1998 campaign with a win in the Breeders' Cup Distaff and was voted American Champion Older Female Horse honors.

Retirement
Escena was retired at the end of her 1998 racing campaign and sold to Guy Snowden for $3.25 million at the January 1999 Horses of All Ages Sale at Keeneland. It was the highest price ever paid for a broodmare or broodmare prospect in Keeneland's history.  She remained in service at Allen Paulson's Brookside Farm (now Diamond A Farm) near Versailles, Kentucky, where she was born and died of old age in 2015.

References
 Escena's pedigree and partial racing stats
 February 07, 2000 Thoroughbred Times article titled Champion Escena delivers first foal

1993 racehorse births
2015 racehorse deaths
Thoroughbred family 13-c
Racehorses bred in Kentucky
Racehorses trained in the United States
Eclipse Award winners
Breeders' Cup Distaff winners